The 2019 Basildon Borough Council election took place on 2 May 2019 to elect members of Basildon Borough Council in Essex. This was on the same day as other local elections. The Conservative Party lost control of the council. which fell under no overall control.

After the election, the composition of the council was
Conservative 20
Labour 15
Independent 6
UKIP 1

Result summary

All comparisons in vote share are to the corresponding 2016 election.

Ward Results
An asterisk denotes an incumbent councillor seeking re-election.

Billericay East

Billericay West

Burstead

Fryerns

Laindon Park

Lee Chapel North

Nethermayne

Pitsea North West

Pitsea South East

St Martin's

Vange

Wickford Castledon

Wickford North

Wickford Park

References

2019 English local elections
2019
2010s in Essex
May 2019 events in the United Kingdom